Joanne Thompson may refer to:

Joanne Thompson (field hockey) (born 1965), English Olympian goalkeeper
Joanne Thompson (politician), Canadian MP elected in 2021

See also
Joan Thompson (1890–1964), English author and suffragette
Lisa Joann Thompson (born 1969), American dancer, choreographer, actress and model
Joanna Thompson, British marathon runner in 1994 IAAF World Road Relay Championships